
Gmina Wielka Nieszawka is a rural gmina (administrative district) in Toruń County, Kuyavian-Pomeranian Voivodeship, in north-central Poland.

Villages
Gmina Wielka Nieszawka contains the villages and settlements of Brzeczka, Brzoza, Chorągiewka, Cierpice, Cierpiszewo, Dybowo, Kąkol, Maciejewo, Mała Nieszawka, Małe Jarki, Pieczenia, Popioły and Wielka Nieszawka.

Neighbouring gminas
Gmina Wielka Nieszawka is bordered by the city of Toruń and by the gminas of Aleksandrów Kujawski, Gniewkowo, Lubicz, Obrowo, Rojewo, Solec Kujawski and Zławieś Wielka.

References
Polish official population figures 2006

Wielka Nieszawka
Toruń County